The 2014–15 Drexel Dragons women's basketball team represents Drexel University during the 2014–15 NCAA Division I women's basketball season. The Dragons, led by twelfth year head coach Denise Dillon, played their home games at the Daskalakis Athletic Center and were members of the Colonial Athletic Association. They finished the season 20–11, 14–4 in CAA play to finish in second place. They lost in the quarterfinals of the CAA women's tournament to Delaware. They were invited to the Women's National Invitational Tournament where they lost to Hampton in the first round.

Roster

Schedule

|-
!colspan=9 style="background:#FFC600; color:#07294D;"| Regular Season

|-
!colspan=9 style="background:#FFC600; color:#07294D;"| CAA tournament

|-
!colspan=9 style="background:#FFC600; color:#07294D;"| WNIT Tournament

See also
 2014–15 Drexel Dragons men's basketball team

References

Drexel Dragons women's basketball seasons
Drexel